John Philip Sousa was an American composer and conductor of the late Romantic era known primarily for American military marches. He composed 136 marches from 1873 until his death in 1932. He derived few of his marches from his other musical compositions such as melodies and operettas. "The Stars and Stripes Forever" is considered Sousa's most famous composition. A British journalist named Sousa "The March King", in comparison to "The Waltz King" — Johann Strauss II. However, not all of Sousa's marches had the same level of public appeal. Some of his early marches are lesser known and rarely performed. He composed marches for several American universities, including the universities of Minnesota, Illinois (now known as University of Illinois Urbana-Champaign), Nebraska, Kansas, Marquette, and the Pennsylvania Military College (now known as Widener University). He served as leader of the Marine Band from 1880 to 1892, and performed at the inaugural balls of President James A. Garfield and Benjamin Harrison.

In 1987, "The Stars and Stripes Forever" was made the national march of the United States, by an act of Congress.  The "U.S. Field Artillery" is the official march of the United States Army. After leaving the Marine Band, he formed a civilian band and went on many tours in the subsequent 39 years. He died on March 6, 1932, at the age of 77, leaving his last march "Library of Congress" unfinished.

List of marches

Notes and references

Notes

Sources

Work cited 
 

Sousa marches
John Philip Sousa
Compositions by John Philip Sousa